is a town located in Kitakatsuragi District, Nara Prefecture, Japan.

As of April 1, 2015, the town has an estimated population of 22,791 and 9,771 households, and a density of around 3,000 people per km². The total area is 7.00 km².

Cultural sites 
Daruma-ji

Transportation

Rail 
West Japan Railway Company
Kansai Main Line (Yamatoji Line): Ōji Station
Wakayama Line: Oji Station - Hatakeda Station
Kintetsu Railway
Ikoma Line: Oji Station
Tawaramoto Line: Shin-Ōji Station

Road 
Japan National Route 25
Japan National Route 168

References

External links

 Town of Ōji 

Towns in Nara Prefecture